Roderick Lake is a lake on the border between Manitoba and Saskatchewan, Canada. The lake is in the Hudson Bay drainage basin. Except for the north-east end, most of the lake is in Saskatchewan.

There are several unnamed inflows, and the primary outflow, at the north-east, is an unnamed stream that flows south to Loon Lake on the Churchill River, a tributary of Hudson Bay.

See also
List of lakes of Saskatchewan

References

Lakes of Manitoba
Lakes of Saskatchewan